Jacob Georg Agardh (8 December 1813 in Lund, Sweden – 17 January 1901 in Lund, Sweden) was a Swedish botanist, phycologist, and taxonomist.

He was the son of Carl Adolph Agardh, and from 1854 until 1879 was professor of botany at Lund University. Agardh designed the current 1862 blueprints for the botanical garden Botaniska trädgården in Lund.

In 1849, he was elected a member of the Royal Swedish Academy of Sciences. Agardh was elected a Foreign Honorary Member of the American Academy of Arts and Sciences in 1878. It is said that the naturalist Mary Philadelphia Merrifield learnt Swedish in order that she could correspond with him.

Works
His principal work, Species, Genera et Ordines Algarum (4 vols., Lund, 1848–63), was a standard authority.

See also
 Swedish botanist Jacob Agardh identified Baudinet's algal specimens

References

Further reading 
 
 Theoria Systematis Plantarum; Accredit Familiarum Phanerogarum in Series Naturales Disposito, Secundum Structurae Normas et Evolutionis Gradus Instituta. Lund Apr–Sep 1858

External links 
 

1813 births
1901 deaths
Fellows of the American Academy of Arts and Sciences
Academic staff of Lund University
Members of the Royal Swedish Academy of Sciences
People from Lund
Pteridologists
Recipients of the Pour le Mérite (civil class)
Swedish botanists
Swedish mycologists
Swedish phycologists
Swedish taxonomists
Members of the Royal Society of Sciences in Uppsala